was a town located in Mihara District, Hyōgo Prefecture, Japan.

As of 2003, the town had an estimated population of 6,202 and a density of 222.37 persons per km2. The total area was 27.89 km2.

On January 11, 2005, Midori, along with the towns of Mihara, Nandan and Seidan (all from Mihara District), was merged to create the city of Minamiawaji.

Dissolved municipalities of Hyōgo Prefecture
Minamiawaji, Hyōgo